Dianji is a town in Woyang County in northwestern Anhui province, China, located around  southwest of the county seat and  south-southeast of downtown Bozhou. , it has one residential community and 9 villages under its administration.

See also 
 List of township-level divisions of Anhui

References 

Towns in Anhui